
Year 255 BC was a year of the pre-Julian Roman calendar. At the time it was known as the Year of the Consulship of Nobilior and Paullus (or, less frequently, year 499 Ab urbe condita). The denomination 255 BC for this year has been used since the early medieval period, when the Anno Domini calendar era became the prevalent method in Europe for naming years.

Events 
 By place 

 Roman Republic 
 The Battle of Adis (or Adys) is fought near the city of that name, 40 miles (64 kilometres) southeast of Carthage, between Carthaginian forces and a Roman army led by Marcus Atilius Regulus. The Romans inflict a crushing defeat upon the Carthaginians, and the latter then sue for peace. The ensuing negotiations between the parties lead to Regulus demanding Carthage agree to an unconditional surrender, cede Sicily, Corsica and Sardinia to Rome, renounce the use of their navy, pay an indemnity, and sign a vassal-like treaty. These terms are so harsh that the people of Carthage resolve to keep fighting.
 The Carthaginians, angered by Regulus' demands, hire Xanthippus, a Spartan mercenary, to reorganize the army. The revitalised Carthaginian army, led by Xanthippus, decisively defeat the Romans in the Battle of Tunis and capture their commander Marcus Atilius Regulus. A Roman fleet, sent to rescue Regulus and his troops, is wrecked in a storm off Sicily.

 Egypt 
 In the Second Syrian War, Ptolemy II loses ground in Cilicia, Pamphylia, and Ionia, while Antiochus II regains Miletus and Ephesus. A peace is then concluded between Antiochus and Ptolemy under which Antiochus is to marry Ptolemy's daughter Berenice Syra.

 Bactria 
 Diodotus I, Seleucid satrap of Bactria, rebels against Antiochus II and becomes the founder of the Greco-Bactrian Kingdom.

 China 
 King Hui of Zhou becomes the last claimant King of the Zhou Dynasty of China.

Births 
 Xu Fu, ancient Chinese alchemist

References